"Goodbye, So Long, Hello" is a song initially recorded by Willie P. Bennett on his 1989 album The Lucky Ones.  It was written by Bennett and Prairie Oyster band member Russell deCarle.  

The song became better known once recorded by Canadian country music group Prairie Oyster.  It was released in February 1990 as the first single from their second studio album, Different Kind of Fire. It peaked at number 3 on the RPM Country Tracks chart in May 1990.  Two different b-sides were used on different editions: a cover of the Willie P. Bennett song "Take My Own Advice", and the Joan Besen song "Different Kind of Fire". Both tracks also appear on the studio album. A double A-side promo version was also released.

Chart performance

Year-end charts

References

1990 singles
Prairie Oyster songs
RCA Records singles
1990 songs
Canadian Country Music Association Single of the Year singles
Songs written by Willie P. Bennett